Lurz is a surname. Notable people with the surname include:

Annika Lurz (born 1979), German swimmer
Dagmar Lurz (born 1959), German figure skater
Thomas Lurz (born 1979), German swimmer

Surnames from nicknames